Arni is a state assembly constituency in Tiruvannamalai district of Tamil Nadu, India, which includes the city of Arni. Its State Assembly Constituency number is 67. Until and including the 2006 elections, the constituency was part of the Vellore constituency for national elections to the Parliament of India; thereafter, it has been part of the Arani parliamentary constituency. It is one of the 234 State Legislative Assembly Constituencies in Tamil Nadu, in India.

Madras State

Tamil Nadu

Election results

2021

2016

2011

2006

2001

1996

1991

1989

1984

1980

1977

1971

1967

1962

1957

1952

References 

Arani Revenue Division
 

Assembly constituencies of Tamil Nadu
Tiruvannamalai district